The Bulgarian Cup is the national ice hockey cup competition in Bulgaria.

Winners
(when available)

References

External links
CSKA Sofia Website

Ice hockey competitions in Bulgaria
National ice hockey cup competitions in Europe